Thalapathy Dinesh (also spelled Thalapathi Dinesh) is an Indian action choreographer who works mainly in Tamil cinema. He started his career in the cinema as an extra fighter in Naan Sigappu Manithan and later he became as a stunt master and actor. Stunt masters like Stun Siva, Peter Hein, Anal Arasu, Hari Dinesh, Pradeep Dinesh, Supreme Sundar, Vicky and Theeppori Nithya have worked as fighters and assistants to him. His sons Hari Dinesh and Pradeep Dinesh are also stunt masters.

Filmography

Fight Master
Films

 1994 Sarigamapadani
 1995 Muthu Kaalai
 1995 Marumagan
 1996 Kizhakku Mugam
 1996 Poovarasan
 1997 Sishya
 1998 Sundara Pandian
 1998 Pooveli
 1999 Nilave Mugam Kaattu
 1999 Rojavanam
 1999 Unakkaga Ellam Unakkaga
 1999 Unnaruge Naan Irundhal
 1999 Aasaiyil Oru Kaditham
 2000 Sandhitha Velai
 2000 Kannan Varuvaan
 2000 Kuberan
 2000 Unnai Kann Theduthey
 2000 Seenu
 2001 Ullam Kollai Poguthae
 2001 Thaalikaatha Kaaliamman
 2001 Sri Raja Rajeshwari
 2001 Asathal
 2001 Lovely
 2001 Azhagana Naatkal
 2002 Shakalaka Baby
 2002 Game
 2003 Kalatpadai
 2003 Unnai Charanadaindhen
 2003 Winner
 2003 Indru
 2004 Jai
 2004 Shock
 2004 Giri
 2004 Oru Murai Sollividu
 2005 Devathayai Kanden
 2005 London
 2005 Thaka Thimi Tha
 2005 Chandramukhi
 2005 Naran (Malayalam)
 2005 Chinna
 2005 Sivakasi
 2005 Vanakkam Thalaiva
 2006 Paramasivan
 2006 Kovai Brothers
 2006 Thirupathi
 2006 Thalai Nagaram
 2006 Kusthi
 2006 Nee Venunda Chellam
 2006 Rendu
 2006 Thagapansamy
 2006 Adaikalam
 2007 Kalakkura Chandru
 2007 Adavadi
 2007 Naan Avanillai
 2007 Parattai Engira Azhagu Sundaram
 2007 Veerappu
 2007 Thottal Poo Malarum
 2007 Arya
 2007 Pasupathi c/o Rasakkapalayam
 2007 Thavam
 2008 Pazhani
 2008 Thangam
 2008 Thotta
 2008 Vambu Sandai
 2008 Sandai
 2008 Kathavarayan
 2008 Aayudham Seivom
 2008 Kuselan
 2008 Panchamirtham
 2009 Padikathavan
 2009 Thee
 2009 Enga Raasi Nalla Raasi
 2009 Guru En Aalu
 2009 Manjal Veiyil
 2009 Ainthaam Padai
 2009 Anthony Yaar?
 2009 Azhagar Malai
 2009 Arumugam
 2009 Mathiya Chennai
 2010 Kutty
 2010 Aasal
 2010 Thambikku Indha Ooru
 2010 Guru Sishyan
 2010 Kola Kolaya Mundhirika
 2010 Pen Singam
 2010 Vaada
 2010 Vallakottai
 2010 Nagaram Marupakkam
 2010 Aattanayagann
 2011 Bhavani
 2011 Mappillai
 2012 Ullam
 2012 Sooriya Nagaram
 2012 Kalakalappu
 2013 Thillu Mullu
 2013 Theeya Velai Seiyyanum Kumaru
 2013 Ya Ya
 2013 Chithirayil Nilachoru
 2013 Vidiyum Munn
 2014 Ninaithathu Yaaro
 2014 Amara
 2014 Uyirukku Uyiraga
 2014 Sooran
 2014 Aranmanai
 2014 Kalkandu
 2015 Ivanuku Thannila Gandam
 2015 Kamara Kattu
 2015 Vilaasam
 2015 Sakalakala Vallavan
 2015 Pokkiri Mannan
 2015 Athiradi
 2016 Aranmanai 2
 2016 Hello Naan Pei Pesuren
 2016 Muthina Kathirikai
 2016 Aasi
 2016 Meen Kuzhambum Mann Paanaiyum
 2016 Kannula Kaasa Kattappa
 2017 Shivalinga
 2017 7 Naatkal
 2017 Thiri
 2017 Katha Nayagan
 2017 En Aaloda Seruppa Kaanom
 2018 Kalakalappu 2
 2018 Utharavu Maharaja
 2020 Velvet Nagaram
 2021 Aranmanai 3
Television
 2005 Malargal
 2009 Dhaayam
 2015 J
 2017 Nandini

Actor
Films

 1989 Uthama Purushan
 1990 Pudhu Padagan
 1990 Pondatti Thevai
 1990 Nadigan
 1990 Mallu Vetti Minor
 1991 Archana IAS
 1991 Sami Potta Mudichu
 1991 Vetri Padigal
 1991 Pudhu Manithan
 1991 Thalapathi
 1992 Enga Veetu Velan
 1992 Killer
 1992 Nadodi Pattukkaran
 1992 Idhu Namma Bhoomi
 1992 Kizhakku Veedhi
 1993 Ejamaan
 1993 Ulle Veliye
 1993 Uzhaippali
 1993 Vedan
 1993 Athma
 1993 Rajadurai
 1993 Chinna Jameen
 1993 Enga Muthalali
 1993 Mechanic Alludu 
 1993 Airport
 1994 En Rajangam
 1994 Adharmam
 1994 Seeman
 1994 Sarigamapadani
 1994 En Aasai Machan
 1994 Thai Maaman
 1995 Baashha
 1995 Rani Maharani
 1995 Muthu Kaalai
 1995 Marumagan
 1995 Asuran
 1995 Periya Kudumbam
 1995 Muthu
 1996 Kizhakku Mugam
 1996 Poovarasan
 1996 Dominic Presentation
 1997 Kaalamellam Kaathiruppen
 1997 Arunachalam
 1997 Sishya
 1997 Once More
 1997 Periya Manushan
 1997 Ratchagan
 1998 Sundara Pandian
 1998 Kannedhirey Thondrinal
 1998 Simmarasi
 1998 Kottaram Veettile Apputtan (Malayalam)
 1998 Pooveli
 1999 Periyanna
 1999 Rajasthan
 1999 Nenjinile
 1999 Nilave Mugam Kaattu
 1999 Rojavanam
 1999 Malabar Police
 1999 Sneha (Kannada)
 1999 Unakkaga Ellam Unakkaga
 1999 Unnaruge Naan Irundhal
 1999 Aasaiyil Oru Kaditham
 2000 Thirunelveli
 2000 Sandhitha Velai
 2000 Kannan Varuvaan
 2000 Kuberan
 2000 Unnai Kann Theduthey
 2000 Seenu
 2000 Manu Needhi
 2001 Vaanchinathan
 2001 Ullam Kollai Poguthae
 2001 Rishi
 2001 Thaalikaatha Kaaliamman
 2001 Sri Raja Rajeshwari
 2001 Dosth
 2001 Asathal
 2001 Lovely
 2001 Narasimha
 2001 Azhagana Naatkal
 2002 Shakalaka Baby
 2002 Ivan
 2002 Game
 2002 Style
 2003 Ramachandra
 2003 Kalatpadai
 2003 Diwan
 2003 Unnai Charanadaindhen
 2003 Winner
 2003 Indru
 2004 Jai
 2004 Gambeeram
 2004 Shock
 2004 Giri
 2004 Oru Murai Sollividu
 2005 Devathayai Kanden
 2005 London
 2005 Thaka Thimi Tha
 2005 Chandramukhi
 2005 Naran (Malayalam)
 2005 Chinna
 2005 Sivakasi
 2005 Vanakkam Thalaiva
 2006 Paramasivan
 2006 Kovai Brothers
 2006 Thirupathi
 2006 Thalai Nagaram
 2006 Kusthi
 2006 Nee Venunda Chellam
 2006 Rendu
 2006 Thagapansamy
 2006 Adaikalam
 2007 Kalakkura Chandru
 2007 Adavadi
 2007 Naan Avanillai
 2007 Parattai Engira Azhagu Sundaram
 2007 Veerappu
 2007 Thottal Poo Malarum
 2007 Arya
 2007 Pasupathi c/o Rasakkapalayam
 2007 Thavam
 2007 Police Story (Kannada)
 2008 Pazhani
 2008 Thangam
 2008 Thotta
 2008 Vambu Sandai
 2008 Sandai
 2008 Kathavarayan
 2008 Aayudham Seivom
 2008 Kuselan
 2008 Kathanayakudu
 2008 Ellam Avan Seyal
 2008 Suryaa
 2008 Panchamirtham
 2009 Padikathavan
 2009 Thee
 2009 Enga Raasi Nalla Raasi
 2009 Guru En Aalu
 2009 Manjal Veiyil
 2009 Gnabagangal
 2009 Ainthaam Padai
 2009 Anthony Yaar?
 2009 Azhagar Malai
 2009 Arumugam
 2009 Mathiya Chennai
 2010 Aasal
 2010 Thambikku Indha Ooru
 2010 Guru Sishyan
 2010 Kola Kolaya Mundhirika
 2010 Pen Singam
 2010 Vaadaa
 2010 Vallakottai
 2010 Nagaram Marupakkam
 2010 Aattanayagann
 2011 Bhavani
 2011 Mappillai
 2012 Ullam
 2012 Sooriya Nagaram
 2012 Kalakalappu
 2013 Thillu Mullu
 2013 Theeya Velai Seiyyanum Kumaru
 2013 Ya Ya
 2013 Chithirayil Nilachoru
 2013 Vidiyum Munn
 2014 Ninaithathu Yaaro
 2014 Amara
 2014 Adhu Vera Idhu Vera
 2014 Aadama Jaichomada
 2014 Uyirukku Uyiraga
 2014 Sooran
 2014 Aranmanai
 2014 Kalkandu
 2015 Aambala
 2015 En Vazhi Thani Vazhi
 2015 Ivanuku Thannila Gandam
 2015 Kamara Kattu
 2015 Vilaasam
 2015 Sakalakala Vallavan
 2015 Pokkiri Mannan
 2015 Athiradi
 2016 Aranmanai 2
 2016 Hello Naan Pei Pesuren
 2016 Muthina Kathirikai
 2016 Tamilselvanum Thaniyar Anjalum
 2016 Aasi
 2016 Meen Kuzhambum Mann Paanaiyum
 2016 Kannula Kaasa Kattappa
 2017 Shivalinga
 2017 7 Naatkal
 2017 Thiri
 2017 Katha Nayagan
 2017 En Aaloda Seruppa Kaanom
 2017 Guru Uchaththula Irukkaru
 2018 Kalakalappu 2
 2018 Utharavu Maharaja
 2019 Vantha Rajavathaan Varuven
 2020 Naan Sirithal
 2020 Velvet Nagaram
 2020 Irandam Kuththu
 2021 Pei Mama
 2021 Aranmanai 3

Television
 2003 Lollu Sabha
 2004 Ahalya
 2010 Thendral
 2016 Vamsam
 2019 Chocolate

Extra fighter

 1985 Naan Sigappu Manithan
 1988  Unnal Mudiyum Thambi
 1987 Per Sollum Pillai
 1987 Oorkavalan
 1987 Annanagar Mudhal Theru
 1987 Vairakkiyam
 1988 Jeeva
 1988 Thaai Paasam
 1988 Soora Samhaaram
 1988 Poovizhi Raja
 1988 Pattikaatu Thambi
 1988 Dhayam Onnu
 1988 Nallavan
 1988 Kaliyugam
 1988 Orkkapurathu
 1989 Rajadhi Raja
 1989 Apoorva Sagodharargal
 1989 Vettaiyaadu Vilaiyadu
 1989 Padicha Pulla
 1989 Dharma Devan
 1989 Varam
 1989 En Thangai
 1989 Annanukku Jai
 1989 Chinnappadass
 1989 Vetri Vizha
 1989 Vetri Mel Vetri
 1990 Ulagam Pirandhadhu Enakkaga
 1990 Athisaya Piravi
 1990 Avasara Police 100
 1991 Maanagara Kaaval
 1992 Amma Vanthachu
 1992 Suyamariyadhai
 1993 Karpagam Vanthachu

Awards and Nominations
 1999 Tamil Nadu State Film Award for Best Stunt Coordinator - Pooveli
 2003 Tamil Nadu State Film Award for Best Stunt Coordinator - Winner & Unnai Charanadaindhen

References

External links

Living people
Indian male film actors
Tamil male actors
Indian action choreographers
1963 births
Indian male television actors
20th-century Indian male actors
Male actors in Tamil cinema